Shapes and Patterns is the fifth studio album by British pop group Swing Out Sister. It was first released in Japan in March 1997, and in Europe and the United states the following year. Producer Paul Staveley O'Duffy, who co-wrote half of the songs on the album, was back at the helm. As an orchestra was once again employed (led by Gavyn Wright), the lush arrangements characteristic of Kaleidoscope World (1989) resurfaced.  The album features the track "Now You're Not Here" which was used as the theme to the Japanese programme  Mahiru No Tsuki, as well as a reworked version of "Better Make It Better" which had featured on their previous studio album, The Living Return (1994). The album was promoted with the singles "Somewhere in the World" and "We Could Make It Happen."

This album would also mark the beginning of the group's collaborations with Japanese musicians in their studio sessions.

The liner notes, written by composer/singer-songwriter Mary Edwards, point out the influences of Burt Bacharach, Jimmy Webb, and John Barry are perceptible in the string arrangements and Latin rhythms, as well as Minnie Riperton, Rotary Connection and The 5th Dimension. Mercury Records distributed Shapes and Patterns in the United States. In an interview with Paul Sexton of Billboard magazine, a marketing executive from Mercury described the challenge associated with promoting the album in the U.S. due to the evolution of the group's music: "When you have a band like Swing Out Sister, you'd have a tough time pinpointing their sound. It's pop, it's urban, it's adult, it's jazz. Europe and Japan don't adhere to those rules as much as America does. It crosses over so many lines, and that's where Swing Out's strength is."

Track listing
 "Somewhere in the World" - 3:45  (Andy Connell/Corinne Drewery/Paul Staveley O'Duffy) 
 "Here and Now" - 5:06  (A. Connell/C. Drewery/P. S. O'Duffy) 
 "We Could Make It Happen" - 5:13  (A. Connell/C. Drewery/P. S. O'Duffy) 
 "Shapes and Patterns" - 0:52  (A. Connell/C. Drewery/P. S. O'Duffy) 
 "Better Make It Better" - 5:23  (A. Connell/C. Drewery) 
 "Something Out of This World" - 5:02  (A. Connell/C. Drewery/P. S. O'Duffy) 
 "Joe Meek's Cat" - 0:23  (C. Drewery/A. Connell/P. S. O'Duffy) 
 "Stoned Soul Picnic" - 5:08  (Laura Nyro) 
 "You Already Know" - 4:34  (A. Connell/C. Drewery/P. S. O'Duffy) 
 "Always" - 5:05   (A. Connell/C. Drewery/P. S. O'Duffy) 
 "Now You're Not Here"  - 4:36  (A. Connell/C. Drewery/P. S. O'Duffy) 
 "Icy Cold as Winter" - 5:13  (A. Connell/C. Drewery/P. S. O'Duffy) 
 "Shapes and Patterns" (Reprise) - 1:23  (A. Connell/C. Drewery/P. S. O'Duffy)

Personnel
Swing Out Sister
 Andy Connell – keyboards
 Corinne Drewery – lead vocals

Additional musicians
 Tim Cansfield – guitars
 Luís Jardim – bass guitar, percussion 
 Andrew Small – drums (1, 2, 5)
 Gota Yashiki – drums (3, 4, 6-13), rhythm programming (3, 8, 9)
 Steve Sidelnyk – rhythm programming (4, 6, 9, 13)
 Larry Williams – saxophone (1, 4, 9, 13)
 Snake Davis – saxophone (3, 6), flute (3, 6), horn arrangements (3, 6)
 Hideyo Takakuwa – flute (11)
 Osamu Koike – saxophone (11)
 Takuo Yamamoto – saxophone (11)
 Bill Reichenbach, Jr. – trombone (1, 4, 9, 13)
 Fayyaz Virji – trombone (3, 6)
 Yoichi Murata – trombone (11), bass trombone (11), horn arrangements (11)
 Gary Grant – trumpet (1, 4, 9, 13), flugelhorn (1, 4, 9, 13)
 Jerry Hey – trumpet (1, 4, 9, 13), flugelhorn (1, 4, 9, 13), horn arrangements (1, 4, 9, 13)
 Steve Sidwell – trumpet (3, 6), flugelhorn (3, 6)
 Toshio Araki – trumpet (11), flugelhorn (11)
 Masahiko Sugasaka – trumpet (11), flugelhorn (11)
 Robin Smith – string arrangements (1, 2, 8)
 Gavyn Wright – string conductor (1, 2, 8)
 The London Session Orchestra – strings (1, 2, 8)
 George Chandler – backing vocals 
 Leon Daniels – backing vocals 
 Derek Green – backing vocals 
 Stevie Lange – backing vocals 
 Sylvia Mason-James – backing vocals 
 Melodie Sexton – backing vocals 
 Beverley Skeete – backing vocals 
 Lance Ellington – backing vocals (7)
 Miriam Stockley – backing vocals (7)
 Frank Campbell – vocal arrangements (7)

Production
 Paul Staveley O'Duffy – producer, mixing 
 Ben Darlow – engineer
 Jon Bailey – assistant engineer
 Steve Cook – assistant engineer
 Ben Georgiades – assistant engineer
 Scott Howland – assistant engineer
 Valerie Jaquot – assistant engineer
 Tatsuya Shimokawa – assistant engineer
 Yutaka Shimoyama – assistant engineer
 Ibi Tijani – assistant engineer
 Yutaka Uematsu – assistant engineer
 Dah Len – photography

Sales and certifications

References

1997 albums
Swing Out Sister albums